Embarras is a term used by French explorers in North America for river obstacles such as blockages, logjams, etc.

Embarras may also refer to:

Embarras, Alberta, a locality in Yellowhead County
Embarras River (Alberta), a tributary of the McLeod River
Embarras River (Illinois), a tributary of the Wabash River

See also
Embarrass (disambiguation)